Brian Hill is an American politician in the U.S. State of Ohio. He is a Republican state legislator who served in both the Ohio House of Representatives and the Ohio Senate.

Biography
Hill earned his associate degree and bachelor's degree from Ohio State University. He previously served for six years as commissioner of Muskingum County. He raises beef cattle and grows crops on a farm he owns with his father. Hill and his family reside in Zanesville, Ohio.

References

Republican Party members of the Ohio House of Representatives
Ohio State University alumni
Living people
Politicians from Zanesville, Ohio
Year of birth missing (living people)
21st-century American politicians